Blackberry Creek may refer to:

Blackberry Creek (Kentucky)
Blackberry Creek (Missouri)